Chuqi Tira (Aymara chuqi gold, tira cradle, "gold cradle", also spelled Choquetira) is a mountain in the Bolivian Andes which reaches a height of approximately . It is located in the La Paz Department, Loayza Province, Malla Municipality. Chuqi Tira lies southeast of Pukarani. The Malla Jawira flows along its southern and south-western slopes.

References 

Mountains of La Paz Department (Bolivia)